Plagiopholis blakewayi, commonly known as Blakeway's mountain snake, is a species of snake in the family Colubridae. The species is found in Myanmar, Thailand, and China.

References

Plagiopholis
Reptiles of Myanmar
Reptiles of China
Reptiles of Thailand
Reptiles described in 1893
Taxa named by George Albert Boulenger